Vorposten Peak is an isolated peak (1,670 m) about  northeast of the Payer Mountains in central Queen Maud Land. This feature was discovered by the Third German Antarctic Expedition (1938–1939), led by Capt. Alfred Ritscher, and named Vorposten (the outpost) because of its location at the eastern extremity of the area explored by the German expedition.

Mountains of Queen Maud Land
Princess Astrid Coast